The Bemidji State Beavers are the athletic teams that represent Bemidji State University, located in Bemidji, Minnesota, in NCAA Division II intercollegiate sports. The Beavers compete as members of the Northern Sun Intercollegiate Conference for all 14 varsity sports with the exceptions of men's and women's ice hockey, which respectively compete as members of the Central Collegiate Hockey Association (CCHA) and Western Collegiate Hockey Association (WCHA).

Varsity

List of teams

Men's sports
 Baseball
 Basketball
 Football
 Golf
 Ice Hockey

Women's sports
 Basketball
 Cross Country
 Golf
 Ice Hockey
 Soccer
 Softball
 Tennis
 Track & Field
 Volleyball

Individual sports

Ice hockey
The men's hockey team is one of seven teams that left the men's division of the WCHA after the 2020–21 season to reestablish the CCHA, whose original version had disbanded after the 2012–13 season. This move in turn led to the demise of the WCHA men's division. Before joining the WCHA in 2010–11, the Beavers had been members of College Hockey America. The women's hockey team competes in the WCHA, now a women-only league. The men's ice hockey team qualified for the 2009 NCAA Division I Men's Ice Hockey Tournament. The team defeated number one seed Notre Dame in a first round upset. The team later defeated Cornell to advance to its first Division I Frozen Four appearance, but then lost to Miami University in the semifinals.

Track and field
As of May 2011, the Men's Track and Field Program will be discontinued due to future budget constraints.

Alumni

 Matt Climie, NHL goaltender
 Brad Hunt, NHL left wing
 Andrew Murray, NHL center
 Gunner Olszewski, NFL wide receiver
 Joel Otto, NHL center
 Matt Read, NHL center

References

External links